The Nearer the Fountain, More Pure the Stream Flows is the second solo studio album by British musician Damon Albarn, best known as the frontman of Blur and Gorillaz. It was released on 12 November 2021, by Transgressive Records. The album's title is derived from the poem "Love and Memory" by John Clare. It is Albarn's first solo album since 2014's Everyday Robots. It was originally planned as an orchestral piece inspired by the landscapes of Iceland, but Albarn expanded the project into a full-length album during the COVID-19 pandemic in 2020.

The album produced five singles: "The Nearer the Fountain, More Pure the Stream Flows", "Polaris", "Particles", "Royal Morning Blue" and "The Tower of Montevideo".

Critical reception 

The Nearer the Fountain, More Pure the Stream Flows was met with favourable reviews from critics. At Metacritic, which assigns a normalised rating out of 100 to reviews from professional publications, the album received an average score of 80, based on 17 reviews. Aggregator AnyDecentMusic? gave it 7.5 out of 10, based on their assessment of the critical consensus.

In his review for The Guardian, Alexis Petridis wrote, "for all its exhausted, preoccupied darkness, The Nearer the Fountain is a genuinely beautiful album."

Year-end lists

Track listing

Personnel 
Credits adapted from the album's liner notes.

Musicians
 Damon Albarn – acoustic guitar (1, 6), Elka Space Organ (1, 3–6, 8–11), piano (2–6, 8–11), Wurlitzer (2, 9–11), bass guitar (2, 4), Hammond S100 (3, 5, 9–11), monochord (3), drums (4, 6), Farfisa organ (4), harmonium (6, 9), bells (8), slate marimba (9), Rhodes Chroma (9–11), iPad strings (9)
 Simon Tong – acoustic guitar (1, 5), electric guitar (1–8, 10), drums (9)
 Josephine Stephenson – cello (1, 4, 7, 8), vocals (1)
 Romain Bly – French horn (1, 2, 4, 7), slate marimba (1, 7)
 Rakel Björn Helgadóttir – French horn (1, 2, 4, 7)
 André de Ridder – violin (1–4, 7)
 Alexina Hawkins – viola (1, 2, 4, 7)
 Sigrún Jónsdóttir – trombone (1, 2, 4, 7, 8)
 Sigrún Kristbjörg Jónsdóttir – trombone (1, 2, 4, 7, 8)
 Árni Benediktsson – field recordings: "Ocean at Hellnar" (1, 7, 8), "Wind Outside House" (8), "Birds Close to the Beach" (10), "Under the Waterfall" (11)
 Mike Smith – Elka Space Organ (3–6, 9), harmonium (4, 5), saxophone (4, 6, 8, 10), Farfisa (6)
 Samuel Egglenton – drum programming (3), bass guitar (4)
 Caimin Gilmore – double bass (3)
 Laura Nygren – double bass (3, 4)
 Carol Jarvis – bass trombone (4, 8)
 Shelley Sörensen – viola (4)
 Bergrún Snæbjörnsdóttir – French horn (8)
 Einar Örn Benediktsson – "a Snapchat" (10)

Technical
 Damon Albarn – production
 Samuel Egglenton – engineering, additional production
 Stephen Sedgwick – mixing
 John Davis – mastering

Art
 OK-RM – design, art direction
 Márton Perlaki – photography

Charts

References 

2021 albums
Damon Albarn albums
Albums produced by Damon Albarn
Albums recorded at Studio 13
Transgressive Records albums